The city of Kakinada in the Indian state of Andhra Pradesh is the capital city of East Godavari district and also a major educational hub fulfilling the growing educational demands of people in the state. The past three decades have witnessed exponential growth of number of residential colleges to offer quality secondary education. There are also several professional colleges in and around the city offering courses in Engineering, Medical, Information Technology, Law and Management at the graduate and postgraduate level.

The Jawaharlal Nehru Technological University, Kakinada offers engineering courses and a school of business, while Rangaraya Medical College is one of the best medical colleges in the state of Andhra Pradesh.

Andhra University Post Graduate Centre (called A.U.M.S.N. PG Centre), established in November 1977, is another important college for higher learning in Kakinada. At present the center is located between 214 National Highway and Kakinada Port – Samalkot ADB Road on a  campus in Thimmapuram village. The campus is nine kilometers from Kakinada Town Railway Station.

Engineering Colleges 
 Aditya Engineering College

General Colleges 
 PR Government College Kakinada

Private Unaided Co-Education Colleges 
 Ideal College of Arts and Sciences

University 
 Jawaharlal Nehru Technological University

Schools 
There are more than 600 schools in Kakinada. Some of the important schools are:

 Ashram Public School

References 

 
Kakinada
Andhra Pradesh-related lists